Distressed Children & Infants International (DCI) is a U.S.-based non-profit organization established at Yale University in 2003 and currently headquartered in Cambridge, Massachusetts.

DCI currently supports initiatives for children in Bangladesh, India, Nepal, and Nicaragua. It works to accomplish its mission through five core programs: its flagship "Sun Child Sponsorship" Program, Healthcare for the Underprivileged Program, Orphan Support Program, Blindness Prevention Program, and its "Journey for Rights and Sight" – an ongoing series of awareness-building events throughout the United States and beyond. DCI works to implement its mission with a number of partner organizations including Rights and Sight for Children (Bangladesh), Diabetic Association of Bangladesh (Bangladesh), Ispahani Eye Hospital (Bangladesh), Tauri Foundation (Bangladesh), Kalinga Eye Hospital and Research Centre (India), Nepal Netra Jyoti Sangh (Nepal), and New Haven/León Sister City Project (Nicaragua).

Mission
DCI describes its mission using two phrases: "Rights and Sight for Children" – to protect child rights, stop child labor, and help families lift themselves out of poverty through education, healthcare, vision care, and income-generating opportunities; and "Children Helping Children" – to connect American youth to less fortunate children in other countries, educating them about the challenges facing children worldwide and inspiring them to take leadership roles in humanitarian causes.

History
Distressed Children & Infants International (DCI) was founded on May 23, 2003, at Yale University by current Honorary Executive Director Dr. Ehsan Hoque and Board Chair Dr. Nina Hoque at the Yale School of Medicine. DCI was officially recognized as a non-profit charitable organization by the United States Government and the Office of the Connecticut Secretary of the State in 2005.

Programs

Sun Child Sponsorship Program
DCI's Flagship "Sun Child Sponsorship" Program was inaugurated in Bangladesh in 2005 and operates in the regions of Patuakhali, Feni, Habiganj, Nilphamari and Dhaka. According to DCI, the program utilizes a comprehensive poverty alleviation model that focuses on individual children while bringing lasting change on a community-wide scale. The program's primary objective is to provide severely underprivileged children with the resources they need to stay in school and continue their learning and education, instead of having to enter the labor force, and thereafter keeping them on track to become independent and productive citizens through education and training opportunities. In addition, the program provides health care as well as family and community support in the form of small business development and adult education.

Healthcare for the Underprivileged Program
DCI's Health for the Underprivileged Program has operated in Dhaka, Bangladesh since 2008. Through a free clinic located within Kallayanpur slum, DCI provides free preventive and curative treatment, including maternal health care, to a community of approximately 9000 slum residents. The clinic operates six days per week and provides free treatment and medicine. Additionally, DCI employs social workers who visit homes to identify health needs and connect patients, especially women and children, with appropriate treatment. The workers educate women on how to better take care of their health care needs and provides information about hospital delivery of newborns. The clinic also runs awareness classes for adolescent girls with the goal of preventing child marriage and teaching female health and hygiene skills.

Blindness Prevention Program
DCI's Blindness Prevention Program was launched in 2007, with the objective of preventing and treating vision loss among underprivileged children and their families. Through this program, DCI conducts free eye screening camps and awareness campaigns for the visually disabled in all of its project locations in Bangladesh, as well as providing eyeglasses to correct refractive errors and arranging free cataract surgeries for children and adults. Similar efforts are also supported with partner organizations in India and Nepal.

Orphan Support Program
DCI's Orphan Support Program was established in 2010 to provide comprehensive support to orphaned children to give them the opportunity to enjoy a normal childhood and grow into well-rounded, independent and productive adult citizens. The program delivers support through DCI's own orphanage facility in Dhaka, Bangladesh, as well as supplemental support to local government-run orphanages.

Journey for Child Rights & Sight and International Conference
DCI regularly holds events throughout the United States to raise awareness about issues affecting children such as child poverty, child labor, and preventable childhood blindness.

In 2006, DCI hosted its first "Conference on Child Rights & Sight" at Yale University: an international conference that gathers speakers and leaders from around the world to address issues of child rights – in particular child labor – and diseases that affect vision, and discuss creative solutions. As of 2020, DCI has held seven international conferences at Yale University: in 2006, 2009, 2011, 2013, 2015, 2017 and 2019. The most recent 7th International Conference on Child Rights & Sight took place at Yale University on Saturday, October 26, 2019.

Patrons and Goodwill Ambassadors
DCI's Patrons and Goodwill Ambassadors include Bangladeshi actress Babita Akhtar and Bangladeshi singer Sabina Yasmin.

Financial accountability
According to DCI, 91% of its funds go to program services (childcare, orphan support, blindness prevention, etc.), 6% goes to fundraising, and 3% goes to management and administration. DCI states that 100 percent of all proceeds from program contributions are used to cover the costs of DCI programs and services, with no portion being used to cover administrative or fundraising costs.

References

External links
 Distressed Children & Infants International

Children's charities based in the United States
Development charities based in the United States
Poverty-related organizations
Rural community development
Charities based in Connecticut